The American Enlightenment was a period of intellectual ferment in the thirteen American colonies in the 18th to 19th century, which led to the American Revolution and the creation of the United States of America. The American Enlightenment was influenced by the 17th- and 18th-century Age of Enlightenment in Europe and native American philosophy. According to James MacGregor Burns, the spirit of the American Enlightenment was to give Enlightenment ideals a practical, useful form in the life of the nation and its people.

The Enlightenment applied scientific reasoning to politics, science, and religion. It promoted religious tolerance and restored literature, arts, and music as important disciplines worthy of study in colleges. A non-denominational moral philosophy replaced theology in many college curricula. Some colleges reformed their curricula to include natural philosophy (science), modern astronomy, and mathematics, and "new-model" American style colleges were founded. Politically, the age is distinguished by an emphasis upon economic liberty, republicanism and religious tolerance, as clearly expressed in the United States Declaration of Independence. Attempts to reconcile science and religion resulted in a rejection of prophecy, miracle, and revealed religion, resulting in an inclination toward deism among some major political leaders of the age. 

Among the foremost representatives of the American Enlightenment were presidents of colleges, including Puritan religious leaders Jonathan Edwards, Thomas Clap, and Ezra Stiles, and Anglican moral philosophers Samuel Johnson and William Smith. Leading political thinkers were John Adams, James Madison, Thomas Paine, George Mason, James Wilson, Ethan Allen, and Alexander Hamilton, and polymaths Benjamin Franklin and Thomas Jefferson. 

The term "American Enlightenment" was coined in the post-World War II era and was not used in the 18th century when English speakers commonly referred to a process of becoming "enlightened."

Dates
Various dates for the American Enlightenment have been proposed, including 1750–1820, 1765–1815, and 1688–1815. One more precise start date proposed is 1714, when a collection of Enlightenment books by Jeremiah Dummer were donated to the library of the college of Yale in Connecticut. They were received by a post-graduate student Samuel Johnson, who studied them. He found that they contradicted his Puritan learning. He wrote that, "All this was like a flood of day to his low state of mind", and that he found himself as if "emerging out of the glimmer of twilight into the full sunshine of open day". Two years later in 1716 as a tutor, Johnson introduced a new curriculum into Yale using Dummer's donated Enlightenment books. Johnson offered what he called "The New Learning", which included the works and ideas of Francis Bacon, John Locke, Isaac Newton, Robert Boyle, Copernicus, and literary works by Shakespeare, John Milton, and Joseph Addison. Enlightenment ideas were introduced to the colonists and diffused through Puritan educational and religious networks especially through Yale College in 1718.

Religious tolerance
Enlightened Founding Fathers, especially Benjamin Franklin, Thomas Jefferson, James Madison and George Washington, fought for and eventually attained religious freedom for minority denominations. According to the Founding Fathers, the United States should be a country where peoples of all faiths could live in peace and mutual benefit. Madison summed up this ideal in 1792 saying, "Conscience is the most sacred of all property."

A switch away from established religion to religious tolerance was one of the distinguishing features of the era from 1775 to 1818. The ratification of the Connecticut Constitution in 1818 has been proposed as a date for the triumph if not the end of the American Enlightenment. That new constitution overturned the 180-year-old "Standing Order" and The Connecticut Charter of 1662, whose provisions dated back to the founding of the state in 1638 and the Fundamental Orders of Connecticut. The new constitution guaranteed freedom of religion and disestablished the Congregational church.

Intellectual currents
The American Enlightenment on the one hand grew from works of European political thinkers such as Locke, Michel de Montaigne, and Jean Jacques Rousseau, who derived ideas about democracy from admiring accounts of American Indian governmental structures brought back from European travelers to the New World in the 16th century. Concepts of freedom and modern democratic ideals were born in "Native American wigwams” and found permanence in Voltaire's Huron. While between 1714 and 1818, an intellectual change took place that seemed to change the British Colonies of America from a distant backwater into a leader in various fields—moral philosophy, educational reform, religious revival, industrial technology, science, and, most notably, political philosophy, the roots of this change were home grown. America saw a consensus on a "pursuit of happiness" based political structure based in large part on Native sources, however misunderstood.

A non-denominational moral philosophy replaced theology in many college curricula. Yale College and the College of William & Mary were reformed. Even Puritan colleges such as the College of New Jersey (now Princeton University) and Harvard University reformed their curricula to include natural philosophy (science), modern astronomy, and mathematics. Additionally, "new-model" American style colleges were founded, such as King's College New York (now Columbia University), and the College of Philadelphia (now University of Pennsylvania).

European sources

Sources of the American Enlightenment are many and vary according to time and place. As a result of an extensive book trade with Great Britain, the colonies were well acquainted with European literature almost contemporaneously. Early influences were English writers including James Harrington, Algernon Sidney, the Viscount Bolingbroke, John Trenchard and Thomas Gordon (especially the two's Cato's Letters), and Joseph Addison (whose tragedy Cato was extremely popular). A particularly important English legal writer was William Blackstone, whose Commentaries on the Laws of England served as a major influence on the American Founders and is a key source in the development Anglo-American common law. Although Locke's Two Treatises of Government has long been cited as a major influence on American thinkers, historians David Lundberg and Henry F. May demonstrate that Locke's Essay Concerning Human Understanding was far more widely read than were his political Treatises.

The Scottish Enlightenment also influenced American thinkers. David Hume's Essays and his History of England were widely read in the colonies, and Hume's political thought had a particular influence on Madison and the drafting of the U.S. Constitution. Francis Hutcheson's ideas of ethics, along with notions of civility and politeness developed by the Earl of Shaftesbury, and Addison and Richard Steele in their Spectator, were a major influence on upper-class American colonists who sought to emulate European manners and learning.

By far the most important French sources to the American Enlightenment were Montesquieu's Spirit of the Laws and Emer de Vattel's Law of Nations. Both informed early American ideas of government and were major influences on the U.S. Constitution. Voltaire's histories were widely read but seldom cited. Noah Webster used Rousseau's educational ideas of child development to structure his famous Speller. The writings of German Samuel Pufendorf were commonly cited by American writers.

Science
Leading scientists included Franklin for his work on electricity; Jared Eliot for his work in metallurgy and agriculture; David Rittenhouse in astronomy, math, and instruments; Benjamin Rush in medical science; Charles Willson Peale in natural history; and Cadwallader Colden for his work in botany and town sanitation. Colden's daughter, Jane Colden, was the first female botanist working in America. Benjamin Thompson was a leading scientist, especially in the field of heat.

Architecture, arts, and culture
After 1780, the Federal style of American Architecture began to diverge from the Georgian style and became a uniquely American genre. In 1813, Ithiel Town designed the first Gothic style church in North America, Trinity Church on the Green in New Haven, Connecticut, predating the English Gothic revival by a decade. In the fields of literature, poetry, music, and drama some nascent artistic attempts were made, particularly in pre-war Philadelphia, but American (non-popular) culture in these fields was largely imitative of British culture for most of the period.

Republicanism and liberalism
American republicanism emphasized consent of the governed, riddance of the aristocracy, and resistance towards corruption. It represented the convergence of classical republicanism and English republicanism (of 17th century Commonwealth men and 18th century English Country Whigs).

J. G. A. Pocock explains the intellectual sources in America:
Since the 1960s, historians have debated the Enlightenment's role in the American Revolution. Before 1960 the consensus was that liberalism, especially that of John Locke, was paramount; republicanism was largely ignored. The new interpretations were pioneered by Pocock who argues in The Machiavellian Moment (1975) that, at least in the early 18th century, republican ideas were just as important as liberal ones. Pocock's view is now widely accepted. Bernard Bailyn and Gordon Wood pioneered the argument that the Founding Fathers were more influenced by republicanism than they were by liberalism. Isaac Kramnick, on the other hand, argues that Americans have always been highly individualistic and therefore Lockean.

In the decades before the American Revolution (1776), the intellectual and political leaders of the colonies studied history intently, looking for guides or models for good (and bad) government. They especially followed the development of republican ideas in England. Pocock explains the intellectual sources in the United States:

The commitment of most Americans to these republican values made inevitable the American Revolution, for Britain was increasingly seen as corrupt and hostile to republicanism, and a threat to the established liberties the Americans enjoyed. Leopold von Ranke, a leading German historian, in 1848 claims that American republicanism played a crucial role in the development of European liberalism:

Declaration of Independence
The United States Declaration of Independence, which was primarily written by Thomas Jefferson, was adopted by the Second Continental Congress on July 4, 1776. The text of the second section of the Declaration of Independence reads:

Many historians find that the origin of the famous phrase "Life, Liberty and the pursuit of Happiness" derives from Locke's position that "no one ought to harm another in his life, health, liberty, or possessions." Others suggest that Jefferson took the phrase from Blackstone's Commentaries on the Laws of England. Others note that William Wollaston's 1722 book The Religion of Nature Delineated describes the "truest definition" of "natural religion" as being "The pursuit of happiness by the practice of reason and truth."

The Virginia Declaration of Rights, which was written by George Mason and adopted by the Virginia Convention of Delegates on June 12, 1776, a few days before Jefferson's draft, in part, reads:

Deism

Both the moderate Enlightenment and a radical or revolutionary Enlightenment were reactions against the authoritarianism, irrationality, and obscurantism of the established churches. Philosophers such as Voltaire depicted organized religion as hostile to the development of reason and the progress of science and incapable of verification. An alternative religion was deism, the philosophical belief in a deity based on reason, rather than religious revelation or dogma. It was a popular perception among the philosophes, who adopted deistic attitudes to varying degrees. Deism greatly influenced the thought of intellectuals and Founding Fathers, including Adams, Franklin, perhaps Washington and especially Jefferson. The most articulate exponent was Thomas Paine, whose The Age of Reason was written in France and soon reached the United States. Paine was highly controversial; when Jefferson was attacked for his deism in the 1800 election, Democratic-Republican politicians took pains to distance their candidate from Paine. Unitarianism and Deism were strongly connected, the former being brought to America by Joseph Priestley. Samuel Johnson called Lord Edward Herbert the "father of English Deism".

See also
 George Washington and religion
 Jefferson Bible
 Liberal democracy
 Secular state
 Separation of Church and State

References

Further reading

Biographies
 Aldridge, A. Owen, (1959). Man of Reason: The Life of Thomas Paine. Lippincott.
 Cunningham, Noble E. In Pursuit of Reason (1988) well-reviewed short biography of Jefferson.
 Weinberger, Jerry Benjamin Franklin Unmasked: On the Unity of His Moral, Religious, and Political Thought (University Press of Kansas, 2008) 

Academic studies
 Allen, Brooke Moral Minority: Our Skeptical Founding Fathers (2007) Ivan R Dee, Inc, 
 Bailyn, Bernard The Ideological Origins of the American Revolution (1992) Belknap Press of Harvard University Press, 
 Bedini, Silvio A Jefferson and Science (2002) The University of North Carolina Press, 
 Cohen, I. Bernard Science and the Founding Fathers: Science in the Political Thought of Jefferson, Franklin, Adams and Madison (1995) W.W. Norton & Co, 
 Dray, Philip Stealing God's Thunder: Benjamin Franklin's Lightning Rod and the Invention of America (2005) Random House, 
 Ellis, Joseph. "Habits of Mind and an American Enlightenment," American Quarterly Vol. 28, No. 2, Special Issue: An American Enlightenment (Summer, 1976), pp. 150–14 in JSTOR
 Ferguson, Robert A. The American Enlightenment, 1750–1820 (1997) Harvard University Press, 
 Gay, Peter The Enlightenment: The Rise of Modern Paganism (1995) W.W. Norton & Company, ; The Enlightenment: The Science of Freedom (1996) W.W. Norton & Company, 
 Greeson, Jennifer "American Enlightenment: The New World and Modern Western Thought." American Literary History (2013) online
 Israel, Jonathan A Revolution of the Mind – Radical Enlightenment and the Intellectual Origins of Modern Democracy (2009) Princeton University Press, 
 Jayne, Allen Jefferson's Declaration of Independence: Origins, Philosophy and Theology (2000) The University Press of Kentucky, ; [traces TJ's sources and emphasizes his incorporation of Deist theology into the Declaration.]
 Koch, Adrienne. "Pragmatic Wisdom and the American Enlightenment," William and Mary Quarterly Vol. 18, No. 3 (July 1961), pp. 313–29 in JSTOR
 May, Henry F. The Enlightenment in America (1978) Oxford University Press, US, ; the standard survey
 May, Henry F. The Divided Heart: Essays on Protestantism and the Enlightenment in America (Oxford UP 1991) online
 McDonald, Forrest Novus Ordo Seclorum: Intellectual Origins of the Constitution (1986) University Press of Kansas, 
 Meyer D.H. "The Uniqueness of the American Enlightenment," American Quarterly Vol. 28, No. 2, Special Issue: An American Enlightenment (Summer, 1976), pp. 165–86 in JSTOR
 Nelson, Craig Thomas Paine: Enlightenment, Revolution, and the Birth of Modern Nations (2007) Penguin, 
 Ralston, Shane "American Enlightenment Thought" (2011), Internet Encyclopedia of Philosophy.
 Reid-Maroney, Nina Philadelphia's Enlightenment, 1740–1800: Kingdom of Christ, Empire of Reason (2000)
 Richard, C.J. Founders and the Classics: Greece, Rome and the American Enlightenment (1995) Harvard University Press, 
 Sanford, Charles B. The Religious Life of Thomas Jefferson (1987) University of Virginia Press, 
 Sheridan, Eugene R. Jefferson and Religion, preface by Martin Marty, (2001) University of North Carolina Press, 
 Staloff, Darren Hamilton, Adams, Jefferson: The Politics of Enlightenment and the American Founding. (2005) Hill & Wang, 
 Winterer, Caroline American Enlightenments: Pursuing Happiness in the Age of Reason (2016) Yale University Press, 
 Wood, Gordon S. The Radicalism of the American Revolution (1993) Vintage, 

Historiography
Winterer, Caroline. "What Was the American Enlightenment?" in The Worlds of American Intellectual History, eds. Joel Isaac, James Kloppenberg, Michael O'Brien, and Jennifer Ratner-Rosenhagen (New York: Oxford University Press, 2016): 19–36.
 Caron, Nathalie, and Naomi Wulf. "American Enlightenments: Continuity and Renewal." Journal of American History (2013) 99#4 pp: 1072–91. online
Dixon, John M. "Henry F. May and the Revival of the American Enlightenment: Problems and Possibilities for Intellectual and Social History." William & Mary Quarterly (2014) 71#2 pp. 255–80. in JSTOR

Primary sources
 Torre, Jose, ed. Enlightenment in America, 1720–1825 (4 vol. Pickering & Chatto Publishers, 2008) 1360 pages; table of contents online at Pickering & Chatto website
 Lemay, A. Leo, ed. Franklin: Writings (Library of America, 1987)
 Jefferson, Thomas. Thomas Jefferson, Political Writings ed by Joyce Appleby and Terence Ball. Cambridge University Press. 1999 online
 Paine, Thomas. Thomas Paine: Collected Writings. Ed. Eric Foner. Library of America, 1995. .
 Smith, James Morton, ed. The Republic of Letters: The Correspondence between Thomas Jefferson and James Madison, 1776–1826'', 3 vols. (1995)